Brada is a genus of polychaetes belonging to the family Flabelligeridae.

The genus has cosmopolitan distribution.

Species:

Brada annenkovae 
Brada arctica 
Brada bransfieldia 
Brada brevis 
Brada ferruginea 
Brada granosa 
Brada granulosa 
Brada incrustata 
Brada inhabilis 
Brada kudenovi 
Brada mammillata 
Brada marchilensis 
Brada nuda 
Brada ochotensis 
Brada pluribranchiata 
Brada rugosa 
Brada sachalina 
Brada strelzovi 
Brada sublaevis 
Brada talehsapensis 
Brada tzetlini 
Brada verrucosa 
Brada whiteavesii

References

Annelids